The 2018–19 VTB United League was the 10th complete season of the VTB United League. It was also the sixth season that the league functions as the Russian domestic first tier level. It started in October 2018 with the first round of the regular season and ended in June 2019 with the last game of the finals.

CSKA Moscow is the defending champion.

Format changes
From this season, the top eight teams qualify for the playoffs. All series are played in a best-of-five format with a 2–2–1 structure.

Teams
A total of 14 teams from six countries contest the league, including nine sides from Russia, one from Belarus, one from Estonia, one from Kazakhstan, one from Latvia and one from Poland.

Zielona Góra made their debut in the competition. Polish teams returned to the competition four years after.

Venues and locations

Personnel and sponsorship

Regular season
In the regular season, teams play against each other twice (home-and-away) in a round-robin format.

Standings

Results

Playoffs
All series are played in a best-of-five series, with a 2–2–1 format.

Bracket

Quarterfinals

|}

Semifinals

|}

Finals

|}

Final table

Awards

Season Awards
Scoring Champion
 Alexey Shved – Khimki
Young Player of the Year
 Nikita Mikhailovsky – Avtodor Saratov
Coach of the Year
 Emil Rajković – Astana
Sixth Man of the Year
 Dorell Wright – Lokomotiv Kuban
Performance of the Season
 Nando de Colo – CSKA Moscow
Defensive Player of the Year
 Maurice Ndour – UNICS
Regular Season MVP
 Alexey Shved – Khimki
Playoffs MVP
 Nikita Kurbanov – CSKA Moscow

MVP of the Month

VTB League teams in European competitions

References

External links
Official website

 
2017-18
2018–19 in European basketball leagues
2018–19 in Russian basketball
2018–19 in Latvian basketball
2018–19 in Estonian basketball
2018–19 in Belarusian basketball
2018–19 in Kazakhstani basketball
2018–19 in Polish basketball